Bill Johnson (28 June 1882 – 14 August 1952) was an  Australian rules footballer who played with South Melbourne and St Kilda in the Victorian Football League (VFL).

Notes

External links 

1882 births
1952 deaths
Australian rules footballers from Victoria (Australia)
Sydney Swans players
St Kilda Football Club players